1988 Egypt Cup Final, was the final match of the 1987–88 Egypt Cup, between football clubs Zamalek and Al Ittihad Alexandria, Zamalek won the match 1–0.

Route to the final

Match details

References

External links

1988
Cup Final
EC 1988
EC 1988